The first season of Ghost Whisperer, an American television series created by John Gray, commenced airing in the United States on September 23, 2005, concluded May 5, 2006, and consisted of 22 episodes. The series follows the life of Melinda Gordon (Jennifer Love Hewitt), who has the ability to see and communicate with ghosts. While trying to live as normal a life as possible—she is married and owns an antique store—Melinda helps earthbound spirits resolve their problems and cross over into the Light, or the spirit world. Her tasks are difficult and at times she struggles with people who push her away and disbelieve her ability. In addition, the ghosts are mysterious and sometimes menacing in the beginning and Melinda must use the clues available to her to understand the spirit's needs and help them.

Ghost Whisperer'''s first season aired in the United States (U.S.) on Fridays at 8:00 PM ET on CBS, a broadcast television network, where it received an average of 10.20 million viewers per episode.

 Premise 
Melinda Gordon is a young woman from the fictional town of Grandview, New York, who has the ability to see and communicate with the dead. Melinda lives with her husband Jim Clancy. She is the owner of an antique shop called "Same as it Never Was." Ghosts seek Melinda's help in relaying a message or completing a task that will put the spirit to rest, and allow them to cross over into The Light (which is possibly Heaven). Those who died with unfinished business become earth-bound and cannot cross over, and Melinda, as their earthly representative, helps them to find peace. The show does not present the ghosts as having sinned, rather it is the spirits' own guilt that condemns them, and their own fear of judgement that keeps them from "crossing over" into an afterlife.

 Plot 
The first season introduces us to Andrea Marino (Aisha Tyler), Melinda's best friend and co-worker. Andrea knows of Melinda's gift, and often helps her figure out why a certain ghost is earthbound. Throughout the season, Melinda repeatedly catches glimpses of a ghost named Romano, a former cult leader from Europe who influenced his followers to commit a mass suicide in 1939. His own suicide transformed him into an earthbound negative entity. Romano attempts to do the exact opposite of Melinda and gather earthbound souls and prevent them from crossing over into the light. Contrary to what Melinda tells them about how their previously departed loved ones are waiting for them in the light, and won’t let anything bad happen to them there, Romano preys on their own fear of judgement, ramping up any notion they hold that they have, in fact, sinned.

At the end of the season, a plane crashes just outside Grandview. Melinda and Romano struggle over the 300 souls of people who die in the crash. Melinda convinces most of the ghosts to cross over, although Romano convinces a select few to come with him. Melinda suffers a huge personal loss when it is revealed that Andrea was killed when her car got caught in the path of the plane crash as she was driving to her brother's apartment.

 Development Ghost Whisperer is based on the work of "Spirit Communicator" James Van Praagh, who is co-executive producer and regularly updates a blog about the show through LivingTV. The stories are also said to be based in part on the work of "Spirit Communicator" Mary Ann Winkowski. Development of the show dates back to at least two years before its premiere.

The show was produced by Sander/Moses Productions in association with CBS Television Studios (originally Paramount Network Television in season one and ABC Studios (originally Touchstone Television in the first two seasons) and CBS Paramount Network Television in seasons two and four).

The show was filmed on the Universal Studios back lot in Los Angeles. One area on the lot is Courthouse Square from the Back to the Future trilogy, though it has been drastically modified to depict Grandview. For example, the clock tower in Back to the Future'' has been completely covered up. Cast and crew members believe that the set gets visits from real spirits.

Sound effects were completed at Smart Post Sound. Visual effects for the pilot and some season one episodes were completed at Flash Film Works. Visual effects for nearly the entire series were created at Eden FX.

Creator John Gray grew up in Brooklyn, New York, which is not far from Grandview-On-Hudson, west of the Hudson River. Piermont is often referenced in episodes as the neighboring town, which is accurate to real life as Grandview-On-Hudson is actually located just north of Piermont. Professor Rick Payne worked in the fictional "Rockland University," and perhaps not coincidentally, the actual Grandview, New York is a village located in Rockland County, New York.

Cast 

 Jennifer Love Hewitt as Melinda Gordon (22 episodes)
 Aisha Tyler as Andrea Marino (22 episodes)
 David Conrad as Jim Clancy (22 episodes)

Episodes

Reception 
In 2015, Gavin Hetherington of SpoilerTV reviewed the two-part season finale as part of a Throwback Thursday special on the site on August 27. Gavin looked back at the season closer fondly, calling it "sensational." He also said that the show "knocked this one out of the park." It had such a high-stakes dilemma that soared the show to new heights, proving it could be exciting and emotional all at the same time. The actors delivered their best performances and the writing was just amazing. We have John Gray to thank for this wonderful show and for writing this wonderful episode."

References 

General references 
 
 
 

1
2005 American television seasons
2006 American television seasons